Fritz Frey was a Swiss sprint canoer who competed in the late 1940s. He finished 11th in the K-2 10000 m event at the 1948 Summer Olympics in London.

References

External links
 

Canoeists at the 1948 Summer Olympics
Olympic canoeists of Switzerland
Swiss male canoeists
Year of birth missing
Possibly living people